This article describes about the squads for the 2022 CONCACAF Women's U-17 Championship.

Group E

Nicaragua 
The squad was announced on 20 April 2022.

Head coach: Jennifer Fernández

Panama 
The squad was announced on 19 April 2022.

Head coach: Raiza Gutiérrez

Mexico 
The squad was announced on 15 April 2022.

Head coach: Ana Galindo

Trinidad and Tobago 
The squad was announced on 20 April 2022.

Head coach: Jason Spence

Group F

Dominican Republic 
The squad was announced on 18 April 2022.

Head coach: Betzaida Ubri

Bermuda 
Head coach: Aaron Denkins

Canada 
The squad was announced on 19 April 2022.

Head coach: Emma Humphries

Jamaica 
The squad was announced on 15 April 2022.

Head coach: Dane Chambers

Group G

Grenada 
Head coach: Randy Boca

Puerto Rico 
The squad was announced on 21 April 2022.

Head coach: Sergio Castro

Costa Rica 
The squad was announced on 18 April 2022.

Head coach: Patricia Aguilar

United States 
The squad was announced on 11 April 2022. Melanie Barcenas was named to the initial 20-player roster, but due to an ankle injury, was replaced prior to the tournament by forward Taylor Suarez.

Head coach: Natalia Astrain

Group H

Cuba 
Head coach: Midel Logal

Haiti 
The squad was announced on 21 April 2022.

Head coach: Harold Edma

Guatemala 
The squad was announced on 20 April 2022.

Head coach: Conrado Paredes

El Salvador 
Head coach: Eric Acuña

Round of 16

Curaçao

Guyana

Honduras

Saint Kitts and Nevis

References 

CONCACAF Women's U-17 Championship
2022 in youth association football